KUPT, virtual and UHF digital channel 29, is a Cozi TV-owned-and-operated television station licensed to Hobbs, New Mexico, United States. Owned by the Telemundo Station Group subsidiary of NBCUniversal, it is a sister station of KUPT-LD in Albuquerque, New Mexico. KUPT's transmitter is located south of the East Seminole Highway in Hobbs, New Mexico.

History
In 1995, KUPT-LP began broadcasting with the advent of the United Paramount Network (UPN). KUPT's first broadcast featured a continuous marathon telecast of the original Star Trek television series.  Following the marathon, the station broadcast a locally produced Texas Tech University football game from Albuquerque, New Mexico. The station also broadcast UPN network programming and syndicated programming, which included Star Trek: Voyager.

On February 9, 2001, KUPT-LP switched to channel 14 in Lubbock, Texas so that the full power KUPT could air on channel 22, and remained so until that channel became the WB affiliate on January 1, 2006 under the KWBZ callsign.

On September 5, 2006, the station began broadcasting as an affiliate of the new MyNetworkTV programming service.

On October 1, 2014, KUPT became an affiliate of Weigel's Movies! TV network. This marked the entry of KUPT into the Albuquerque TV market. KUPT's programming was previously seen on KMYL-LD in Lubbock.

On February 1, 2015, KUPT became an affiliate of Weigel's Heroes & Icons TV network, with Movies! moving to 29.3 on KUPT.

The station broadcasts about 50 basketball games each year from American Sports Network. Starting with the 2011 football season, the station is also part of the Southland Conference Television Network.

Technical information

Subchannels
The station's digital channel is multiplexed:

Analog-to-digital conversion
KUPT discontinued regular programming on its analog signal, over UHF channel 29, on June 12, 2009, the official date in which full-power television stations in the United States transitioned from analog to digital broadcasts under federal mandate. The station's digital signal relocated from its pre-transition UHF channel 16 to channel 29.

See also
 KJTV-TV
 KLCW-TV

References

External links

Television channels and stations established in 1987
UPT
Television stations in Lubbock, Texas
1987 establishments in New Mexico
1987 establishments in Texas
Heroes & Icons affiliates
Telemundo Station Group